The Salmon and Ball is a public house at 502 Bethnal Green Road, Bethnal Green, located next to Bethnal Green tube station.

It is a Grade II listed building, dating back to the mid-19th century.

References

External links
 

Grade II listed pubs in London
Grade II listed buildings in the London Borough of Tower Hamlets
Bethnal Green
Pubs in the London Borough of Tower Hamlets